Sosigenes is a lunar impact crater on the west edge of Mare Tranquillitatis. Its diameter is 17 km. It was named after ancient Greek astronomer Sosigenes of Alexandria. It lies to the east of the large walled plain Julius Caesar. The crater rim has a high albedo, making it relatively bright. It has a small central rise at the midpoint of the floor.

To the east on the mare is a formation of parallel rilles designated the Rimae Sosigenes. These follow a course to the north, and have a length of about 150 kilometers. The small, bowl-shaped crater Sosignes A lies across one of these rilles.

Satellite craters
By convention these features are identified on lunar maps by placing the letter on the side of the crater midpoint that is closest to Sosigenes.

References

External links

at The Moon Wiki
Rimae Sosigenes at The Moon Wiki - on its rille
 LTO-42D4 Sulpicius Gallus — L&PI topographic map
Is the Moons' Fault - the rille Rimae Sosigenes not mentioned in that article
  - one of the craters depicts Sosigenes
 

Impact craters on the Moon